The Vancouver Chinese Music Ensemble is an ensemble of traditional Chinese musical instruments based in Vancouver, British Columbia, Canada.  The ensemble performs both at concerts and at community events. Their music encompasses both traditional Chinese pieces and modern music by composers from around the world.

History
The Vancouver Chinese Music Ensemble was established in 1989. The classically trained musicians perform on traditional Chinese instruments, including erhu, dizi, pipa, yangqin, guzheng, and ruan.
In 1994 the band released an album, Nine-Fold Heart, on Ponchee Records.  The album contained both traditional Chinese dance music and modern compositions.  A second album, Transplanted Purple Bamboo, was released in 2000.  Their 2005 album New Frontiers, received local radio play.

In 2007 the ensemble performed at the Mission Folk Music Festival.  In 2016 they participated in the downtown concert at the Vancouver Cherry Blossom Festival. The ensemble performs regularly at the Dr. Sun-Yat Sen Classical Chinese Garden in Vancouver.

Discography
1994 - Nine-Fold Heart
2000 - Transplanted Purple Bamboo
2005 - New Frontiers

References

External links
Vancouver Chinese Music Ensemble official site

Musical groups established in 1989
Musical groups from Vancouver
Chinese musical instrument ensembles
1989 establishments in British Columbia
Chinese-Canadian culture in Vancouver